Stefan Wigger (26 March 1932 in Leipzig, Germany- 13 February 2013 in Munich) was a German television actor.

Selected filmography
 Life Begins at Eight (1962)
 I Am Looking for a Man (1966)
 Hocuspocus (1966)

References

External links

Short Biography 

1932 births
2013 deaths
German male television actors
Actors from Leipzig
German male voice actors
Rundfunk im amerikanischen Sektor people